Tina Peters (1955/1956) is a former Mesa County, Colorado, County Clerk and Recorder, and has been covered in regional, national, and international news since 2020 for her department's mistake in running the November 2019 election and having a role in subsequent elections, yet asserting election fraud. She was notably "one of at least twenty-two election deniers vying [in 2022] to take charge of elections in eighteen states.", and she has been the first elections official in the U.S. to face criminal charges related to stolen election conspiracy theories surrounding the 2020 U.S. presidential election.

Chronology
Her position as county clerk with Mesa County was her first elected office held, when she was elected in 2018.  She campaigned with a platform that called for improvement in service from Colorado state's Division of Motor Vehicles' offices.

Early in 2020, it was discovered that there were over 500 uncounted ballots left in a parking lot ballot box in front of Mesa County election headquarters in Grand Junction, Colorado. These ballots had been cast for the November 2019 election in Mesa County. Workers under the supervision of Tina Peters had failed to empty the ballot box prior to the election ending and these ballots remained there for months before being discovered. This incident and other issues led to a voter recall attempt for Peters, which failed to gather the minimum required number of signatures to appear on the ballot in 2020.

Subsequent to the 2020 U.S. presidential election, Peters permitted access to voting machines to an outsider. She was indicted in 2021 "on charges that she allowed someone to improperly access and download data from election machines as she sought to prove that widespread fraud had occurred in the state’s 2020 presidential election."  She was "the first elections official to face criminal charges related to conspiracy theories surrounding the 2020 election, experts said. She is accused not of fixing the election but of breaking the law as she sought to investigate whether someone else did."

She was barred from supervising local elections in 2021 and 2022.

Peters has been in national news relating to her view on possibility of election fraud in the 2020 US presidential election, and with respect to an instance in which subsequent access to Mesa County voting machines was given. She was in Sioux Falls, South Dakota speaking at Mike Lindell's Cyber Symposium on Aug. 10, 2021, at around the same time that investigators from the Colorado Secretary of State's office were investigating how Ron Watkins obtained images from the Mesa County voting system.

In April 2022, at an appearance together, Lindell disclosed having personally donated an amount in the range from $200,000 to $800,000 to Peter's legal defense fund and campaign, in apparent violation of Colorado state law limiting donations of that type to $75. The state's ethics commission investigated the fund after a complaint about a lack of donor transparency.
Tina Peters denied prior knowledge.

She was a 2022 candidate for Colorado Secretary of State in Republican primary election which concluded Tuesday, June 28. She lost the primary election. She finished second of three candidates and, at least immediately following the release of result, suggested election fraud and did not accept the result.  National and international news, before and after June 28, featured Peters in coverage of U.S. election deniers running for positions of management or influence in conduct of future elections.

In July 2022, a warrant for her arrest was issued, for her having travelled out of state without court permission as required, when she appeared at another Mike Lindell event, in Las Vegas. Peters claimed not to know of the restriction, her three attorneys claimed not to have told her, and the arrest order was cancelled.

Also in July 2022, a second warrant for her arrest was issued, and Peters turned herself in.  She was arrested due to her having emailed  multiple county clerk's offices, letting them know she was seeking a recount with hand counting, in violation of her bond conditions of her arrest for election machine tampering. After turning herself in, she was allowed to repost bond and was again released.

In late July 2022, Peters paid the $256,000 required for the state to conduct a manual recount of the voting for Colorado Secretary of State in Republican primary election in which she ran.  The recount barely changed the totals, with Peters gaining 13 votes, and still having vote share of 29 percent.  Peters filed suit challenging methods used in the recount, and on August 6, 2022, that suit was dismissed.

On August 7, 2022, Peters pled not guilty to all charges related to the alleged election machine tampering, and a trial was set for March of 2023. In early March 2023, she received a Mesa County jury trial on some of the charges, and the jury convicted her of misdemeanor obstruction of a government operation. She was acquitted on the charge of obstructing a peace officer, a charge that originated from a laptop computer warrant incident in 2022 at a café. Police investigators had a warrant to take her personal laptop computer, in the investigation of an incident in a Mesa County courtroom, where she was accused of violating courtroom rules by recording proceedings with the computer. She awaits trial later in 2023 on the more serious felony indictments.

Personal
Peters lives in Grand Junction, Colorado. Peters' son, Remington J. Peters, a combat veteran serving in the US military as a Navy SEAL, died in 2017 at age 27 in a parachute accident. Notices at the time indicated surviving him were father, mother, and a sister.

Before she ran for the Mesa County Clerk and Recorder position, "she ran a construction firm with her ex-husband and sold nutritional supplements and wellness products through a multilevel-marketing company. She was best known around the Western Slope of Colorado as the mother of a Navy seal who had served in Iraq and Afghanistan and, in 2017, died in a catastrophic accident when his parachute failed to properly open during an air show over the Hudson River. Her main campaign pledge was to reopen shuttered Motor Vehicle Department offices in the county."

On September 7, The New Yorker published a long article by Sue Halpern titled: "The Election Official Who Tried to Prove "Stop the Steal": How a group of conspiracy theorists enlisted a county clerk in Colorado to find evidence that the 2020 vote was rigged."

References

External links
Tina Peters campaign website

1950s births
20th-century American women
Colorado politicians
County clerks in Colorado
Living people
People from Grand Junction, Colorado
Year of birth missing (living people)